This article lists events from the 1580s in Scotland.

Incumbents
Monarch of Scotland
James VI (1567–1625)

Events

1586
Treaty of Berwick

References 

 
1582 in Scotland
1583 in Scotland
1586 in Scotland